The 2010–11 Austin Peay Governors basketball team represented Austin Peay State University in the 2010–11 NCAA Division I men's basketball season. The Governors, led by head coach Dave Loos, played their home games at the Winfield Dunn Center in Lawrenceville, New Jersey, as members of the Ohio Valley Conference. The Governors finished in a tie for 2nd in the OVC during the regular season, earning the 3rd seed in the Ohio Valley tournament. Austin Peay advanced to the semifinals of the OVC tournament, where they were eliminated by eventual tournament champions Morehead State.

Austin Peay failed to qualify for the NCAA tournament, but were invited to the 2011 College Basketball Invitational. The Governors were eliminated in the first round of the CBI, losing to Boise State, 83–80.

Roster 

Source

Schedule and results

|-
!colspan=9 style=|Exhibition

|-
!colspan=9 style=|Regular season

|-
!colspan=9 style=| Ohio Valley tournament

|-
!colspan=9 style=| CBI

Source

References

Austin Peay Governors men's basketball seasons
Austin Peay
Austin Peay
Austin Peay men's basketball
Austin Peay men's basketball